The World Rugby Women’s 15s Player of the Year is awarded annually by World Rugby at the World Rugby Awards. Prior to 2015, the IRB presented the Women's Player of the Year award from 2001–2002 and in, 2012 and 2014. The IRB Women's Personality of the Year award was presented from 2003–2011.

Winners and nominees

References

External links

World Rugby Awards

World Rugby Awards